The Minister of Public Administration of Estonia is a minister at the Ministry of Finance in the Estonian Government.

List of Ministers of Public Administration

See also
Ministry of Finance

References

External links
Ministry of Finance

Public Administration